Zamanov is a surname.

Those bearing it include:

 Nuru Zamanov (fl. 2000s), Azerbaijan footballer on Spartak Baku
 Nadir Zamanov (fl. 2000s), Azerbaijan footballer on Kavkaz Belokan
 Elnur Zamanov (fl. 2000s), Azerbaijan footballer on Araz Naxçivan
 Andreas Zamanov (fl. 2000s),  Former estonian footballer on Jk Tarvas II

See also 
 Zamenhof